Oplurus fierinensis, also known as the Anzamala Madagascar swift or Madagascar blue iguana, is a saxicolous (rock dwelling) iguana endemic to Madagascar.

Description
As the name suggests, the Madagascar blue iguana is blue, although can be different shades of blue or grey, depending upon the lighting.  The ventral side is plain gray.  The coloration provided good camouflage while living among the blue-grey rocks. It can reach a total length of 28 cm.

Distribution 
This species is endemic to Madagascar and has been found in the region of Toliara in southwest Madagascar.

References

Oplurus
Reptiles of Madagascar
Endemic fauna of Madagascar
Reptiles described in 1869
Taxa named by Alfred Grandidier